Richard A. Carter (February 21, 1919 – April 22, 2002) was an American football and basketball coach. He served as the head football coach at Graceland College in Lamoni, Iowa, first as a junior college coach from 1947 to 1956 and then transitioning the program to a four-year, varsity unit beginning in 1957 until 1959. Carter spent one season as the head football coach at the University of Central Missouri in 1962.

Head coaching record

College football

References

External links
 

1919 births
2002 deaths
Central Missouri Mules football coaches
Graceland Yellowjackets football coaches
Graceland Yellowjackets football players
Graceland Yellowjackets men's basketball coaches